Niklas Klingberg (born 13 April 1985) is a Swedish footballer who plays for and coaches Alingsås IF as a defender.

References

External links
 

1985 births
Living people
Swedish footballers
Association football defenders
Örebro SK players
Enköpings SK players
Degerfors IF players
Torslanda IK players
Allsvenskan players
Superettan players
Ettan Fotboll players